This is a list of cricket leagues in T20 format at the domestic level in all the major cricket playing countries. In 2003, the England and Wales Association introduced the first T20 domestic league named the Twenty20 Cup (now known as T20 Blast).

International T20 League

Men's

 Current

All the listed tournaments have T20 status recognized by the ICC.

 Former

Notes:- 
All the listed tournaments have T20 status recognized by the ICC.
Abu Dhabi T20 Trophy was an invitational tournament and there was no criteria of being a champion of their respective T20 tournaments.

Women's

 Current

 Former

Domestic and franchise T20 competitions by region

Africa

Kenya

East Africa

South Africa

Zimbabwe

Americas

Canada 
CIBC National Cricket League (2005–present)
Global T20 Canada (2018–present)

United States 
American Twenty20 Championship (2011)
Major League Cricket (2023)
Minor League Cricket (2021)
American Premier League (2021)
Cricket All-Stars

West Indies (Caribbean) 
Stanford 20/20 (2006–2008)
Stanford Super Series (2008), included domestic T20 champions from England and West Indies as well as an England XI and 'Stanford Superstars' team picked from the West Indies' players
Caribbean Twenty20 (2010–2013)
Caribbean Premier League (2013–present), franchise league
Twenty20 Blaze (2012–present)
Women's Caribbean Premier League (2022–present), franchise league

Asia

Afghanistan 
Afghanistan Premier League (2018–present), franchise league
Shpageeza Cricket League (2013–present), known as Etisalat Sixes T20 Tournament (2013)

Bangladesh 
National Cricket League Twenty20 (2010)
Victory Day T20 Cup (2013)
Bangladesh Premier League (2012–present), franchise league
Dhaka Premier Division Twenty20 Cricket League (2019–present)
Bangabandhu T20 Cup (2020)

Hong Kong 
Hong Kong T20 Blitz (2016–2019)

India 
Indian Premier League (2008–present), franchise league
Global Power Cricket League
Syed Mushtaq Ali Trophy : Inter-State T20 Championship (2009–present)
Karnataka Premier league (2009–present)
Tamil Nadu Premier League (2016–present)
Women's T20 Challenge (2018–2022)
Indian Cricket League (2007–2009), franchise league with city based teams as well national representative teams from India, Pakistan, Bangladesh and rest of the World.
Celebrity Cricket League (2011-present)
Road Safety World Series (2020–present)
Legends League Cricket Season 2 (2022)
Women's Premier League (2023–present),  franchise league

Nepal 
 Everest Premier League (2017–present) 
 Dhangadhi Premier League (2017–present) 
 Pokhara Premier League (2018–present)
Women's Champions League (2019–present)
 Nepal T20 League (2022–present)

Malaysia 
MCA T20 Championship (2014–2016)

Oman 
Legends League Cricket Season 1 (2021/22)

Pakistan 
Pakistan Super League (2016–present), franchise league
National T20 Cup (2004–present) 
Kashmir Premier League (2021–present)
Ramadan T20 Cup (2013)
Haier Super 8 T20 Cup (2011–2015)
National Triangular T20 Women's Cricket Championship (2020–present)
Pakistan Junior League (2022), franchise league

Sri Lanka 
SLC Twenty20 Tournament (2004–2018)
SLC Super Provincial Twenty20 (2008–2016)
Sri Lanka Premier League (2011–2012), franchise league
Super 4's T20 (2014)
SLC T20 League (2018)
Lanka Premier League (2020–present), franchise league

United Arab Emirates 
Abu Dhabi T20 Trophy (2018), a franchise league
Masters Champions League (2016), franchise league for retired players
International League T20 (2023–present), franchise league

Australasia

Australia 
KFC Twenty20 Big Bash (2005–2011)
Big Bash League (2011–present), franchise league
Australian Women's Twenty20 Cup (2007–2015)
Women's Big Bash League (2015–present), franchise league

New Zealand 
Men's Super Smash (2005–present)
Women's Super Smash (2007–present)

Europe

England and Wales 
Twenty20 Cup, known as:
Twenty20 Cup (2003–2009)
Friends Life t20 (2010–2013)
Natwest T20 Blast (2014–2017)
Vitality Blast (2018–present)
Women's Twenty20 Cup (2009–present)
Women's Cricket Super League (2016–2019)
Charlotte Edwards Cup (2021–present)

Netherlands 
Dutch Twenty20 Cup (2007–present)

Scotland 
Murgitroyd Twenty20 (2008–present)
Regional Pro Series (2016)

Scotland and Netherlands 
North Sea Pro Series (2014–2015)

Ireland 
Inter-Provincial Trophy (2013–present)
Arachas Super T20 Trophy (2015–present)

Ireland, Scotland and the Netherlands
Euro T20 Slam (2022–present)

Multi-national T20 competitions 
International 20:20 Club Championship (2005), hosted by Leicestershire County Cricket Club in England
Champions League Twenty20 (2009–2014)
British Asian Cup (2009), a one-off match between England's domestic T20 champions and India's IPL champions

References 

Twenty20 cricket

Domestic